The 1960 Iowa gubernatorial election was held on November 8, 1960. Republican nominee Norman A. Erbe defeated Democratic nominee Edward Joseph McManus with 52.14% of the vote.

Primary elections
Primary elections were held on June 6, 1960.

Democratic primary

Candidates
Edward Joseph McManus, incumbent Lieutenant Governor
Harold Hughes, Chairman of the State Commerce Commission

Results

Republican primary

Candidates
Norman A. Erbe, Attorney General of Iowa
Jack Schroeder, State Senator
William H. Nicholas, former Lieutenant Governor

Results

General election

Candidates
Norman A. Erbe, Republican
Edward Joseph McManus, Democratic

Results

References

1960
Iowa
Gubernatorial